The Camden Battlefield is the site of the Battle of Camden on 16 August 1780, a British victory by General Charles Cornwallis over a mixed force of Continental Army regulars and state militia forces led by General Horatio Gates. Flat Rock Rd (S-28-58) passes roughly through the center of the battlefield, and United States Route 521 marks its eastern boundary. It was declared a National Historic Landmark in 1961.

Description and history

British General Charles Cornwallis, had encamped at Camden in the summer of 1780 to secure northern South Carolina against the threat of Continental Army forces in North Carolina. Both commanders then ordered a night march to attack the other. These forces met in the dark at 2:00 AM on the morning of August 16. After a brief clash, both sides formed lines, and resumed the battle at daybreak. The battle was a rout, as the militia forces under Gates' command threw down their weapons and fled at the first gunfire, and his Continental forces were eventually surrounded and forced to surrender, with their commander, Baron Johann de Kalb suffering mortal injuries. The defeat marked a low point in the battle for American independence.

The area where this battle took place is roughly defined by Gum Swamp Creek and another further to its east, both of which drain into Lake Shamokin to the north. This area is roughly bisected by Flat Rock Rd, along which a marker has been placed where Baron de Kalb fell. The area is largely composed of grasslands and forest, much as it would have been at the time of the battle.

See also
List of National Historic Landmarks in South Carolina
National Register of Historic Places in Kershaw County, South Carolina

References

External links
Camden Battlefield, Kershaw County (S.C. Sec. Rd. 58, Camden vicinity), at South Carolina Department of Archives and History

Military facilities on the National Register of Historic Places in South Carolina
National Historic Landmarks in South Carolina
Geography of Kershaw County, South Carolina
American Revolutionary War sites
Camden, South Carolina
National Register of Historic Places in Kershaw County, South Carolina
American Revolution on the National Register of Historic Places